Sonapur is a village in the Topgachchi VDC in the Jhapa district in Nepal.

Sources 

Populated places in Jhapa District